The Immediate Geographic Region of Dores do Indaiá is one of the 6 immediate geographic regions in the Intermediate Geographic Region of Divinópolis, one of the 70 immediate geographic regions in the Brazilian state of Minas Gerais and one of the 509 of Brazil, created by the National Institute of Geography and Statistics (IBGE) in 2017.

Municipalities 
It comprises 9 municipalities.

 Bom Despacho    
 Dores do Indaiá     
 Estrela do Indaiá    
 Luz     
 Martinho Campos 
 Moema   
 Pompéu    
 Quartel Geral    
 Serra da Saudade

See also 

 List of Intermediate and Immediate Geographic Regions of Minas Gerais

References 

Geography of Minas Gerais